Avraham Mor (May 5, 1935 – December 16, 2012) was an Israeli actor and voice actor.

Biography
Born in Tel Aviv, Mor started out in his teenage years performing in a show for the Hashomer Hatzair alongside fellow actors Uri Zohar and Illi Gorlitzky. He then began studying acting within the drama studio of the Cameri Theatre for the next two years. Mor also found stage acting opportunities in the Habima Theatre and starred in many plays which includes Kazablan as well as taking part in the comedy troupe known as Batzal Yarok.

On screen, Mor found professional opportunities on cinema and television. His earliest film appearance took place in 1966 and he starred in 10 other films throughout the next 30 years, most notably Alex Holeh Ahavah, Fortuna and Laura Adler's Last Love Affair. On television, Mor appeared on Rechov Sumsum, Parpar Nechmad and more. On the television show Downtown Precinct, he had a recurring role as the central character's father.

Mor was known internationally as a voice dubber. He performed major Hebrew dubbing roles for Disney which includes Happy in Snow White and the Seven Dwarfs, Archimedes Q. Porter in Tarzan, Maurice in Beauty and the Beast, Al in Toy Story 2, Horace in One Hundred and One Dalmatians and The Sultan in Aladdin. Other roles included Reverend Clement Hedges in Wallace & Gromit: The Curse of the Were-Rabbit as well as Grandpa Simpson in The Simpsons Movie''.

Personal life
From 1978 until his death in 2012, Mor was married to sociologist Dalia Mor who was 18 years his junior.  They had two sons.

Death
On 16 December 2012, Mor died in Meir Hospital from cancer at the age of 77.  He was survived by his wife and two sons and was buried at the Menucha Nechona Cemetery.

References

External links

 
 

1935 births
2012 deaths
Male actors from Tel Aviv
Israeli male film actors
Israeli male stage actors
Israeli male television actors
Israeli male voice actors
Jewish Israeli male actors
20th-century Israeli male actors
21st-century Israeli male actors
Deaths from cancer in Israel